A coffee bean is a seed of the Coffea plant and the source for coffee. It is the pip inside the red or purple fruit. This fruit is often referred to as a coffee cherry. Just like ordinary cherries, the coffee fruit is also a so-called stone fruit. Even though the coffee beans are not technically beans, they are referred to as such because of their resemblance to true beans. The fruits; cherries or berries, most commonly contain two stones with their flat sides together. A small percentage of cherries contain a single seed, instead of the usual two. This is called a "peaberry". The peaberry occurs only between 10% and 15% of the time, and it is a fairly common (yet scientifically unproven) belief that they have more flavour than normal coffee beans. Like Brazil nuts (a seed) and white rice, coffee beans consist mostly of endosperm.

The two most economically important varieties of coffee plant are the Arabica and the Robusta; approximately 60% of the coffee produced worldwide is Arabica and ~40% is Robusta. Arabica beans consist of 0.8–1.4% caffeine and Robusta beans consist of 1.7–4.0% caffeine. As coffee is one of the world's most widely consumed beverages, coffee beans are a major cash crop and an important export product, accounting for over 50% of some developing nations' foreign exchange earnings. This has made coffee very important in culture and food around the world. In 2017, 70% of total coffee production was exported, worth US$19.9 billion.

History

Significant dates
According to legend, the coffee plant was discovered in Ethiopia by a goat herder named Kaldi around 850 AD, who observed increased physical activity in his goats after they consumed coffee beans.
The coffee plant was first found in the mountains of Yemen. Then by 1500, it was exported to the rest of the world through the port of Mocha, Yemen. 
First cultivation in India (Chikmagalur) – 1600
First cultivation in Europe – 1616
First cultivation in Java – 1699
First cultivation in Caribbean (Cuba, Hispaniola, Jamaica, Puerto Rico) – 1715–1730
First cultivation in South America – 1730
First cultivation in Dutch East Indies – 1720
Roasted beans first sold on retail market (Pittsburgh) – 1865
Important spray-drying techniques developed in 1950s, which along with freeze drying are a method to create instant coffee

Distribution

Brazil produces about 45% of the world's total coffee exports, with most grown in Brazil. The United States imports more coffee than any other nation. As of 2015, Americans consumed approximately 400 million cups of coffee per day, making the United States the leading consumer of coffee in the world.

Coffee plants grow within a defined area between the Tropics of Cancer and Capricorn, termed the bean belt or coffee belt.

Etymology
The Oxford English Dictionary suggests that the European languages generally appear to have gotten the name from Turkish kahveh, about 1600, perhaps through Italian caffè. Arab qahwah, in Turkish pronounced kahveh, the name of the infusion or beverage; said by Arab lexicographers to have originally meant "wine" or some type of wine, and to be a derivative of a verb-root qahiya "to have no appetite". Another common theory is that the name derives from Kaffa Province, Ethiopia, where the species may have originated.

Coffee plant

As the tree gets older, it produces less fruit and slowly loses any pest- and disease-resistance.

Coffee plants are often grown in rows metres/feet apart (depending on the desired density chosen by the farmer). Some farmers plant other trees, such as shade trees or other cash-crop trees, such as orange trees around them or plant the coffee on the sides of hills, because they need specific conditions to flourish. More rain is needed at the beginning of the season when the fruit is developing and less later in the season as it ripens.

Two lesser known species grown for consumption are Coffea liberica and Coffea racemosa.

Processing

When the fruit is ripe, it is almost always handpicked, using either "selective picking",  where only the ripe fruit is removed, or "strip-picking", where all of the fruit is removed from a limb all at once. Selective picking is often used to produce higher quality coffee because the cherries are picked at their ripest. Strip-picking is indiscriminate and will harvest unripe, ripe, and over-ripe fruit. To improve quality after strip-picking, the harvest must be sorted.

The Asian palm civet eats coffee berries and excretes the beans. Because the civet prefers the taste of the ripest cherries, the civet selectively harvests the cherries. Its digestive system then processes the beans by breaking down the mucilage and pulp surrounding the seed. Once the seeds are excreted by the civet, they can be harvested, processed and sold as a niche product. Once they are finally processed, these beans are called kopi luwak, and are often marketed as a rare and expensive coffee.

Two methods are primarily used to process coffee berries. The first, "wet" or "washed" process, has historically usually been carried out in Central America and areas of Africa. The flesh of the cherries is separated from the seeds and then the seeds are fermented – soaked in water for about two days. This softens the mucilage, which is a sticky pulp residue that is still attached to the seeds.  Then this mucilage is washed off with water.

The "dry processing" method, cheaper and simpler, was historically used for lower-quality beans in Brazil and much of Africa, but now brings a premium when done well. Twigs and other foreign objects are separated from the berries and the fruit is then spread out in the sun on concrete, bricks or raised beds for 2–3 weeks, turned regularly for even drying.

Composition

The term "green coffee bean" refers to unroasted mature or immature coffee beans. These have been processed by wet or dry methods to remove the outer pulp and mucilage and have an intact wax layer on the outer surface. When immature, they are green. When mature, they have a brown to yellow or reddish color and typically weigh 300 to 330 mg per dried coffee bean. Nonvolatile and volatile compounds in green coffee beans, such as caffeine, deter many insects and animals from eating them. Further, both nonvolatile and volatile compounds contribute to the flavor of the coffee bean when it is roasted. Nonvolatile nitrogenous compounds (including alkaloids, trigonelline, proteins, and free amino acids) and carbohydrates are of major importance in producing the full aroma of roasted coffee and for its biological action. Since the mid-2000s, green coffee extract has been sold as a nutritional supplement and has been clinically studied for its chlorogenic acid content and for its lipolytic and weight-loss properties.

Nonvolatile alkaloids

Caffeine (1,3,7-trimethylxanthine) is the alkaloid most present in green and roasted coffee beans. The content of caffeine is between 1.0% and 2.5% by weight of dry green coffee beans. The content of caffeine does not change during maturation of green coffee beans. Lower concentrations of theophylline, theobromine, paraxanthine, liberine, and methylliberine can be found. The solubility of caffeine in water increases with temperature and with the addition of chlorogenic acids, citric acid, or tartaric acid, all of which are present in green coffee beans. The xanthine alkaloids are odorless, but have a bitter taste in water, which is masked by organic acids present in green coffee.

Trigonelline (N-methyl-nicotinate) is a derivative of vitamin B6 that is not as bitter as caffeine. In green coffee beans, the content is between 0.6% and 1.0%.

Proteins and amino acids
Proteins account for 8% to 12% of dried green coffee beans. A majority of the proteins are of the 11-S storage kind (alpha – component of 32 kDa, beta – component of 22 kDa), most of which are degraded to free amino acids during maturation of green coffee beans. Further, 11-S storage proteins are degraded to their individual amino acids under roasting temperature, thus are an additional source of bitter components due to generation of Maillard reaction products. High temperature and oxygen concentration and low pH degrade 11-S storage proteins of green coffee beans to low-molecular-weight peptides and amino acids. The degradation is accelerated in the presence of organic acids such as chlorogenic acids and their derivatives. Other proteins include enzymes, such as catalase and polyphenol oxidase, which are important for the maturation of green coffee beans. Mature coffee contains free amino acids (4.0 mg amino acid/g robusta coffee and up to 4.5 mg amino acid/g arabica coffee). In Coffea arabica, alanine is the amino acid with the highest concentration, i.e. 1.2 mg/g, followed by asparagine of 0.66 mg/g, whereas in C. robusta, alanine is present at a concentration of 0.8 mg/g and asparagine at 0.36 mg/g. The free hydrophobic amino acids in fresh green coffee beans contribute to the unpleasant taste, making it impossible to prepare a desirable beverage with such compounds. In fresh green coffee from Peru, these concentrations have been determined as: isoleucine 81 mg/kg, leucine 100 mg/kg, valine 93 mg/kg, tyrosine 81 mg/kg, phenylalanine 133 mg/kg. The concentration of gamma-aminobutyric acid (a neurotransmitter) has been determined between 143 mg/kg and 703 mg/kg in green coffee beans from Tanzania. Roasted coffee beans do not contain any free amino acids; the amino acids in green coffee beans are degraded under roasting temperature to Maillard products (reaction products between the aldehyde group of sugar and the alpha-amino group of the amino acids). Further, diketopiperazines, e.g. cyclo(proline-proline), cyclo(proline-leucine), and cyclo(proline-isoleucine), are generated from the corresponding amino acids, and are the major source of the bitter taste of roasted coffee. The bitter flavor of diketopiperazines is perceptible at around 20 mg/liter of water. The content of diketopiperazines in espresso is about 20 to 30 mg, which is responsible for its bitterness.

Carbohydrates
Carbohydrates make up about 50% of the dry weight of green coffee beans. The carbohydrate fraction of green coffee is dominated by polysaccharides, such as arabinogalactan, galactomannan, and cellulose, contributing to the tasteless flavor of green coffee. Arabinogalactan makes up to 17% of dry weight of green coffee beans, with a molecular weight of 90 kDa to 200 kDa. It is composed of beta-1-3-linked galactan main chains, with frequent members of arabinose (pentose) and galactose (hexose) residues at the side chains comprising immunomodulating properties by stimulating the cellular defense system (Th-1 response) of the body. Mature brown to yellow coffee beans contain fewer residues of galactose and arabinose at the side chain of the polysaccharides, making the green coffee bean more resistant to physical breakdown and less soluble in water. The molecular weight of the arabinogalactan in coffee is higher than in most other plants, improving the cellular defense system of the digestive tract compared to arabinogalactan with lower molecular weight. Free monosaccharides are present in mature brown to yellow-green coffee beans. The free part of monosaccharides contains sucrose (gluco-fructose) up to 9000 mg/100 g of arabica green coffee bean, a lower amount in robustas, i.e. 4500 mg/100 g. In arabica green coffee beans, the content of free glucose was 30 to 38 mg/100 g, free fructose 23 to 30 mg/100 g; free galactose 35 mg/100 g and mannitol 50 mg/100 g dried coffee beans, respectively. Mannitol is a powerful scavenger for hydroxyl radicals, which are generated during the peroxidation of lipids in biological membranes.

Lipids
The lipids found in green coffee include: linoleic acid, palmitic acid, oleic acid, stearic acid, arachidic acid, diterpenes, triglycerides, unsaturated long-chain fatty acids, esters, and amides. The total content of lipids in dried green coffee is 11.7–14 g/100 g. Lipids are present on the surface and in the interior matrix of green coffee beans. On the surface, they include derivatives of carboxylic acid-5-hydroxytryptamides with an amide bond to fatty acids (unsaturated C6 to C24) making up to 3% of total lipid content or 1200 to 1400 microgram/g dried green coffee bean. Such compounds form a wax-like cover on the surface of the coffee bean (200–300 mg lipids/100 g dried green coffee bean) protecting the interior matrix against oxidation and insects. Further, such molecules have antioxidative activity due to their chemical structure. Lipids of the interior tissue are triglycerides, linoleic acid (46% of total free lipids), palmitic acid (30% to 35% of total free lipids), and esters. Arabica beans have a higher content of lipids (13.5–17.4 g lipids/100 g dried green coffee beans) than robustas (9.8–10.7 g lipids/100 g dried green coffee beans). The content of diterpenes is about 20% of the lipid fraction. The diterpenes found in green coffee include cafestol, kahweol and 16-O-methylcafestol. Some of these diterpenes have been shown in in vitro experiments to protect liver tissue against chemical oxidation. In coffee oil from green coffee beans the diterpenes are esterified with saturated long chain fatty acids.

Nonvolatile chlorogenic acids
Chlorogenic acids belong to a group of compounds known as phenolic acids, which are antioxidants. The content of chlorogenic acids in dried green coffee beans of arabica is 65 mg/g and of robusta 140 mg/g, depending on the timing of harvesting. At roasting temperature, more than 70% of chlorogenic acids are destroyed, leaving a residue less than 30 mg/g in the roasted coffee bean. In contrast to green coffee, green tea contains an average of 85 mg/g polyphenols. These chlorogenic acids could be a valuable, inexpensive source of antioxidants. Chlorogenic acids are homologous compounds comprising caffeic acid, ferulic acid and 3,4-dimethoxycinnamic acid, which are connected by an ester bond to the hydroxyl groups of quinic acid. The antioxidant capacity of chlorogenic acid is more potent than of ascorbic acid (vitamin C) or mannitol, which is a selective hydroxy-radical scavenger. Chlorogenic acids have a bitter taste in low concentrations such as 50 mg/L water. At higher concentrations of 1 g/L water, they have a sour taste. Chlorogenic acids increase the solubility of caffeine and are important modulators of taste.

Volatile compounds
Volatile compounds of green coffee beans include short-chain fatty acids, aldehydes, and nitrogen-containing aromatic molecules, such as derivatives of pyrazines (green-herbeaceous-earthy odor). Briefly, such volatile compounds are responsible for the less pleasing odor and taste of green coffee versus roasted coffee. Commercial success was realized by Starbucks in creating Green Bean Refreshers using a process that primarily isolates the caffeine from the green beans but does not actually use steeped liquid from the beans. Many consumers experiment with creating green bean "extract" by steeping green coffee beans in hot water. Often, the recommended times of steeping (20 minutes to 1 hour) extract too much caffeine to provide a pleasant taste. A steeping time of 12 minutes or under provides a more palatable liquid that can be used as a base for a drink containing more of the nutrients and less caffeine that using just isolated caffeine extract. The alkaline stock base that results can be paired with acidic or fruity extracts, with or without sweetener, to mask the vegetable-like taste of the extract.

When green coffee beans are roasted, other molecules with the typical pleasant aroma of coffee are generated, which are not present in fresh green coffee. During roasting, the major part of the unpleasant-tasting volatile compounds are neutralised. Unfortunately, other important molecules such as antioxidants and vitamins present in green coffee are destroyed. Volatile compounds with nauseating odor for humans have been identified, including acetic acid (pungent, unpleasant odor), propionic acid (odor of sour milk, or butter), butanoic acid (odor of rancid butter, present in green coffee with 2 mg/100 g coffee beans), pentanoic acid (unpleasant fruity flavor, present in green coffee at 40 mg/100 g in coffee beans), hexanoic acid (fatty-rancid odor), heptanoic acid (fatty odor), octanoic acid (repulsive oily rancid odor); nonanoic acid (mild nut-like fatty odor); decanoic acid (sour repulsive odor), and  derivatives of such fatty acids – 3-methyl-valeric acid (sour, green-herbaceous, unpleasant odor), acetaldehyde (pungent-nauseating odor, even when highly diluted, present in dried green coffee beans at concentrations of about 5 mg/kg), propanal (choking effect on respiratory system, penetrating-nauseating), butanal (nauseating effect, present in dried green coffee beans at 2–7 mg/kg), or pentanal (very repulsive nauseating effect).

References

External links

 

Coffea
Edible nuts and seeds
Crops
Coffee